ESPRIT, or the Elite Sport Performance Research in Training is a UK EPSRC and UK Sport funded research project aiming to develop pervasive sensing technologies for better the understanding of the physiology and biomechanics of athletes in training, and apply the technologies to enhance the well being and healthcare of general public.

Key research themes 
 Generalised Body Sensor Networks - Imperial College London
 Optimised Sensor Design and Embodiment - Queen Mary University of London
 Learning, Data Modelling and Performance Optimisation - UK Sport, Imperial College London
 Device and Technology Innovation (GOLD) in elite sports - Loughborough University

Proof of concept projects 
 Application of a solid-state saliva-based system to monitoring circadian rhythms in elite athletes - Swansea University
 Real-time wireless localisation for team sports using body-centric communications - Queen's University Belfast
 Optimized athlete body sensor networks for simulation-based performance analysis - Southampton University

Showcase/secondment projects 
 Monitor the effects of a warm-up on power production and wheelchair performance - Loughborough University
 Using interleukin-6 (IL-6) as a measurement of exercise-induced inflammation - Loughborough University
 Improvement of Powerwheel for racing wheelchairs - Frazer-Nash Consultancy Ltd.
 Ankle and Foot Modelling in Elite Cycling - Paul Francis

Sports exemplars 
A number of sports exemplars have been selected in the ESPRIT Programme to demonstrate and validate the application of pervasive sensing technology in elite sport performance monitoring

Healthcare exemplars 
One of the main objectives of the ESPRIT project is to extend the developed sensing technology for wellbeing and healthcare applications. To demonstrate the application of the technology, a number of healthcare exemplars have been selected.
 Fall detection
 Post-operative care
 Rehabilitation after knee-replacement surgery
 COPD patient monitoring
 Elderly care

Key Partners

See also 
 Wireless sensor networks

References

External links 
 

Imperial College London
Loughborough University
Science and technology in Leicestershire
Sports science